Osama bin Laden was a rogue bull elephant named after the terrorist leader Osama bin Laden. He was responsible for at least 27 deaths and destruction of property in the jungled Sonitpur district of the Indian state of Assam. After a two-year rampage from 2004 to 2006, the elephant was eventually shot, though some were doubtful that the correct animal had been killed.

Attacks
Osama bin Laden was a rogue bull elephant active in the Indian state of Assam, in the vicinity of Behali, near Tezpur. The province has an estimated population of 5,300 Asiatic elephants.

The elephant was mockingly named after the terrorist Osama bin Laden. At the time of the attacks, the elephant was thought to be between 45 and 50 years old. He was given the status of a "rogue" elephant in the summer of 2006 after his death toll reached double-digit figures.

The elephant was said not to fear firecrackers or fire. During his attacks, he killed 27 people in the state of Assam, including 14 during the six months preceding his death.

In northeastern India, human and elephant conflicts have become problematic. Expansion of human activities and destruction of elephants' natural habitat has resulted in elephants foraging for food where humans are situated. From 2001 to 2006 in Assam, more than 250 people were killed by elephants; distraught villagers killed 268 elephants, mainly by poisoning.

Death
Indian officials issued a "shoot to kill" directive for Osama bin Laden in mid-December 2006, with a deadline of the end of the month. Local villagers used drums and fire to trap the elephant in the corner of the plantation. He was approached by hunter Dipen Phukan; however, once the elephant realised what was about to happen he charged the hunter, who killed him as he rapidly approached. Phukan said, "It was charging towards me and I kept firing. Another few yards and it would have run over me." It had been identified as Osama bin Laden as it had no tusks.

However officials were concerned that it was not the right elephant, with the death taking place a considerable distance –  – from where he had been seen previously. Forestry officials were accused of killing an innocent elephant, while conservation groups were concerned about the possibility of revenge attacks by other elephants of the same herd.

Other elephants
Post 9/11, villagers in Assam started calling elephants which damaged their crops or homes Osama bin Laden, viewing them as terrorists. In 2008, another elephant also named "Osama bin Laden" – that caused more than 11 fatalities and dozens of injuries – was shot dead in Jharkhand.

See also

 Human–wildlife conflict
 List of individual elephants
 Osama bin Laden in popular culture
 Musth

Notes

References

External links

Photo of elephant Osama Bin Laden (slain) USA Today

2006 animal deaths
Animal rights
Cruelty to animals
Deaths by firearm in India
Elephant attacks
Elephants in India
Individual animals in India
Individual elephants
Individual wild animals
Osama bin Laden
Sonitpur district